Frederick I (9 September 1826 – 28 September 1907) was the Grand Duke of Baden from 1858 to 1907.

Life 
Frederick was born in Karlsruhe, Baden, on 9 September 1826. He was the third son of Leopold, Grand Duke of Baden and Princess Sophie of Sweden. He became the heir presumptive to the grand duchy upon the death of his father in 1852 and the accession of his brother as Grand Duke Louis II. Due to his brother's mental ill-health, he was regent ad interim of Baden in 1852–1855, and took the title of grand duke in 1856. His brother, Louis II, died in 1858. He was considered a relatively liberal supporter of a constitutional monarchy. During his reign the option of civil marriages was introduced in Baden as well as direct elections to the Lower House of the Parliament of Baden in 1904.

In 1856, Frederick married Princess Louise, daughter of Prince Wilhelm of Prussia and Princess Augusta of Saxe-Weimar-Eisenach. The couple had three children.

Frederick I had a pivotal role in the history of the Zionist movement. In 1896 he met Theodor Herzl (the founder of political Zionism) via their mutual acquaintance the reverend William Hechler, and helped Herzl in obtaining an audience with his nephew Wilhelm II, German Emperor. After some persuasion on the part of the grand duke, the emperor accepted the appeal for an audience. It took place in Palestine on 2 November 1898, during the emperor's visit to inaugurate the Church of the Redeemer, Jerusalem.

Frederick I was present at the proclamation of the German Empire at Versailles in 1871, as he was the only son-in-law of Prussian King Wilhelm I and one of the reigning sovereigns of Germany. He loudly shouted, "His Majesty, Emperor Wilhelm!" He died at his summer residence at the island of Mainau in southern Germany on 28 September 1907. Today, Mainau is owned by the Lennart Bernadotte Foundation, created by Frederick's great-grandson Count Lennart Bernadotte, (1909–2004).

Issue 
 Grand Duke Frederick II of Baden (9 July 1857 – 9 August 1928), married Princess Hilda of Luxembourg; no issue
 Queen Victoria of Sweden (7 August 1862 – 4 April 1930), married King Gustav V of Sweden; had issue
 Prince Louis of Baden (12 June 1865 – 23 February 1888), died unmarried; no issue

Honours 
German honours

Foreign honours

Ancestry

Footnotes 

1826 births
1907 deaths
Nobility from Karlsruhe
Princes of Baden
Protestant monarchs
House of Zähringen
Grand Dukes of Baden
Grand Crosses of the Order of Saint Stephen of Hungary
Recipients of the Order of the Netherlands Lion
Knights Grand Cross of the Military Order of William
Extra Knights Companion of the Garter
3
3
3
Grand Croix of the Légion d'honneur
Knights of the Golden Fleece of Spain
Recipients of the Order of the White Eagle (Russia)
Recipients of the Order of St. Anna, 1st class
Grand Crosses of the Order of Saint-Charles